Nomani Tonga (born 16 May 1983 in Neiafu) is a Tongan rugby union player, currently playing with the  in South Africa. His regular position is lock or flanker.

Career
He started his career at local club Falaleu Marist Rugby Club, where he played between 2000 and 2004. He joined Hull in 2005, where he played for one season.

In 2008, he joined South African team , where he made his debut for them in the 2008 Vodacom Cup and has played in excess of 60 matches for them.

References

Tongan rugby union players
Living people
1983 births
Border Bulldogs players
People from Vavaʻu
Rugby union locks